The Nelson Police Department is the police force for the City of Nelson, British Columbia, Canada.

Among the oldest police services in British Columbia, the force came into being as a municipal police force on April 17, 1897.  The initial force consisted of one chief constable and one constable.  Over the years of its existence, the Nelson Police Department has grown from two to twenty members. Chief Constable Donovan Fisher has been the Chief Constable since 2021.

Nelson Police Department is one of eleven municipal police forces in British Columbia. The department is governed under the authority of the BC Police Act.

Nelson Police Board
 Board Chair: Mayor Janice Morrison (since 2022)
 Director: Lindsay MacKay by Municipal Appointment (since 2022)
 Director: Devon Caron by Provincial Appointment (since 2022)
 Director: Jane Byers by Provincial Appointment(since 2019)
 Director: Lena Horswill by Provincial Appointment (since 2019)
 Director: Sue Adam by Provincial Appointment (since 2018)

References

External links
 Nelson Police Department
 Office of the Chief Constable
 Nelson Police Board Agreement with Nelson Police Association
Restorative Justice School Program
Nelson Police Department Strategic Plan

Law enforcement agencies of British Columbia
1897 establishments in British Columbia
Nelson, British Columbia